Dameian Jeffries (born May 7, 1973) is a former American football defensive end. He played college football for Alabama before being selected in the fourth round of the 1995 NFL Draft by the New Orleans Saints. He appeared in two games for the Saints in 1995. Jeffries later played for the Mobile Admirals in the short-lived Regional Football League in 1999.

Baseball player Zelous Wheeler is his nephew.

References 

1973 births
People from Sylacauga, Alabama
Players of American football from Alabama
Living people
American football defensive ends
Alabama Crimson Tide football players
New Orleans Saints players
Regional Football League players